Properties and districts listed as California Historical Landmarks within Kern County. 

Note: Click the "Map of all coordinates" link to the right to view a Google map of all properties and districts with latitude and longitude coordinates in the table below.

Listings

|}

References

See also

List of California Historical Landmarks
National Register of Historic Places listings in Kern County, California

.
List of California Historical Landmarks
C01
Kern County, California
History of the Mojave Desert region
History of the San Joaquin Valley